The Orleans is a hotel and casino located in Paradise, Nevada, near the Las Vegas Strip. It is owned and operated by Boyd Gaming. It includes the large multipurpose Orleans Arena that can be converted into an ice rink and can seat 9,000 attendees.

Though The Orleans attracts a fair number of tourists, particularly during the Mr. Olympia contest, it is primarily considered to be a locals casino.

History
The $173 million Orleans opened on 88 acres of land on December 18, 1996, with 840 hotel rooms. When the Orleans first opened, it did not perform up to expectations. In 1999 a major addition to the casino and other amenities were added. The success of these changes has been demonstrated by continued expansions in later years.

The Orleans Arena was added in 2003. A second hotel tower was added in 2004.

The location has the distinction of having hosted the final concert performance from stand-up comedian George Carlin, on June 15, 2008.

Attractions
Besides its casino and arena, The Orleans includes:
Movie theater
Bowling center with 52 lanes, a pro shop
Spa
Beauty salon
Video game arcade
Conference facilities

Notable performers

Musicians:
Air Supply
Akon
Paul Anka
David Archuleta
Rodney Atkins
Atlantic Starr
Stevie B
Babyface
Bassnectar
Dierks Bentley
Big Bad Voodoo Daddy
Clint Black
The Black Eyed Peas
Boyz II Men
Brooks & Dunn
David Cassidy
The Charlie Daniels Band
Judy Collins
Alice Cooper
Robert Cray
Creedence Clearwater Revisited
Burton Cummings
Billy Ray Cyrus
Perry Danos
Daughtry
Dennis DeYoung
The Doobie Brothers
Europe
The Everly Brothers
Don Felder
Foghat
Foreigner
Four Tops
Kenny G
Gin Blossoms
Lesley Gore
Lee Greenwood
Engelbert Humperdinck
Ice Cube
Etta James
Wynonna Judd
Kansas
Evelyn 'Champagne' King
KISS
Gladys Knight
Grand Funk Railroad
Kool & the Gang
Kris Kristofferson
Jerry Lee Lewis
Lifehouse
The Little River Band
Kenny Loggins
Demi Lovato
Patti LuPone
The Manhattan Transfer
The Marshall Tucker Band
Richard Marx
Don McLean
Jo Dee Messina
Midnight Star
Eddie Money
Naughty By Nature
Vince Neil
Newsboys
Night Ranger
Ted Nugent
Daniel O'Donnell
The Oak Ridge Boys
Ohio Players
Donny Osmond
The Osmonds
Panic! at the Disco
Parliament Funkadelic
Stephen Pearcy
Peter, Paul & Mary
Kellie Pickler
Helen Reddy
REO Speedwagon
André Rieu
The Righteous Brothers
Rihanna
LeAnn Rimes
Kelly Rowland
Leon Russell
Neil Sedaka
Kenny Wayne Shepherd
Frank Sinatra, Jr.
Dee Snider
Trey Songz
The SOS Band
Rick Springfield
Sugarhill Gang
Styx
The Temptations
Three Dog Night
TobyMac
Tone Lōc
Tower of Power
Trans-Siberian Orchestra
Travis Tritt
Tanya Tucker
Uncle Kracker
Van Halen
Deniece Williams
Kip Winger
Wisin & Yandel
Lee Ann Womack
Young MC
Comedians:
Jim Belushi
Bill Engvall
George Carlin
Dana Carvey
Mike Epps
Billy Gardell
Frank Gorshin
D. L. Hughley
Larry the Cable Guy
Vicki Lawrence
Bill Maher
Carlos Mencia
Dennis Miller
Tom Papa
Don Rickles
Bob Saget
Sinbad
The Smothers Brothers
Lily Tomlin
George Wallace
Shawn & Marlon Wayans
Steven Wright
Dancers/illusionists/other celebrities:
Lance Burton
Paul W Draper
Mitzi Gaynor
David Hasselhoff
Jabbawockeez

References

External links

 

Boyd Gaming
Casinos in the Las Vegas Valley
Skyscraper hotels in Paradise, Nevada
Hotels established in 1996
Casino hotels
Casinos completed in 1996